Haplochromis dichrourus is a species of cichlid endemic to Lake Victoria, but has not been seen since 1986.  This species grows to a length of  SL. It may be extinct, but is maintained as Critically Endangered by the IUCN in the small chance that a tiny –but currently unknown– population survives.

References

dichrourus
Fish described in 1922
Fish of Lake Victoria